Weinmannia raiateensis is a species of plant in the family Cunoniaceae. It is endemic to French Polynesia.

References

raiateensis
Endemic flora of French Polynesia
Near threatened plants
Near threatened biota of Oceania
Taxonomy articles created by Polbot